Mora, also called Mora by, is a locality situated in Säter Municipality, Dalarna County, Sweden with 817 inhabitants in 2010.

References 

Populated places in Dalarna County
Populated places in Säter Municipality